Aegopis is a genus of air-breathing land snails, terrestrial pulmonate gastropod mollusks in the family Zonitidae, the true glass snails.

Species
Species within the genus Aegopis include:
 Aegopis verticillus
 Aegopis acies

References

Zonitidae
Gastropod genera